A ready room is a compartment (the Navy's term for a room on a ship) on an aircraft carrier where air crews (Naval Aviators, and depending on the type of squadron Naval Flight Officers and enlisted Naval Aircrewmen) conduct much of their pre-flight and post-flight briefs. Each flight squadron has its own individual ready room, and it is common for the squadron's "Maintenance Control" office to be located next to or near the ready room. (Maintenance Control is where pilots review possible existing problems with an aircraft, and it is where they officially sign for the aircraft. This is also where air crews can get "Maintenance Action Forms" post-flight to report any new problems.)

Squadron pilots in the Second World War considered the ready room to be a clubroom.  One personal view from a World War II pilot stated:

Typical contents and personnel of a ready room 
The typical ready room is equipped as follows:
Armchair seats with fold-up table tops for the air crews. The commanding officer (CO) and executive officer (XO) sit in the front row on either side of the aisle, with the CO on the left, reflecting a pilot's seat in a cockpit, and with the XO on the right, reflecting a co-pilot's seat in a cockpit.
A coffee urn and sometimes a popcorn machine for those nights when a movie is shown.
A loudspeaker tied in to the ship's 1MC (1 Main Circuit) public address system
A white board at the front of the room.
An aircraft tracking board where the status of all aircraft preparing for flight and those in flight are tracked. These also include the names of the crew members and a code for the mission type.

The typical "on duty" ready room personnel include the Squadron Duty Officer (SDO) and the Assistant Squadron Duty Officer (ASDO) who serves as a phone talker who uses the aircraft tracking board. Ready rooms are typically also occupied by air crews who are catching up on paperwork and the space also often serves as a place for small informal meetings. Once flight operations are complete for the day it's common for a movie to be shown for anyone in the squadron that can attend.

Operations 
One humorous memorandum by a pilot on the USS Wasp (CV-18) had this to say of the Wasp's ticker tape:
Much of a pre-flight brief is conducted over a closed-circuit television system for all the air crews together (regardless of squadron) who are scheduled to take off, or "launch," at the start of any particular flight cycle (cycles generally are about 90 minutes; some aircraft usually fly a single cycle while others may fly for two or three cycles before returning). These briefs are broadcast from the ship's Air Operations Department and include general mission details (so that everyone is aware of what other crews will be doing), various procedures, radio frequencies and weather reports. Additional briefing may be conducted in other areas of the ship depending on the mission type. (Fighter/attack crews will generally brief in Strike Operations, for instance.)

The ship's Air Operations Department communicates with the ready room via the ASDO when reporting launch and landing times, and standard telephones are used for other communications.

Placement of ready rooms 
In the autumn of 1945, CinCPAC conducted a review of aircraft carrier design, intended to produce a successor design to that of the Essex-class aircraft carrier, based upon contrasting experiences of British and U.S. carriers encountering kamikaze attacks off Okinawa.  The British design had successfully resisted such attacks, whilst the U.S. design had not.

The report touched upon the issue of the location of ready rooms:
On Nimitz and Ford class aircraft carriers the ready rooms are located on the 03 level directly under the flight deck. Also on this level are the "lofts" (a throwback to "parachute lofts") where air crew survival equipment is kept and maintained.

References 

Aircraft carriers